Daniel Katzen  is a French horn teacher and player, and, since September 2008, has been the Associate Professor of Horn at the University of Arizona's Fred Fox School of Music in Tucson.  Prior to that,  he was Second Horn in the Boston Symphony Orchestra (BSO) from April 1979 to August 2008. He is a recitalist, chamber musician, clinician and soloist and has appeared in 22 states and 25 countries in 5000 performances and master classes.  He can be heard  on virtually all recordings with the BSO and the Boston Pops from 1979–2000, and has also recorded with the Empire Brass and other chamber groups. Prof. Katzen taught horn at Boston University  and the New England Conservatory from 1981–2008, and at CalArts from 2000–2007.  He has consulted with the University of California, Irvine orchestral performance program since 2000, and has performed and recorded with various Los Angeles orchestras and film studios. Among the films in which he has played are Schindler's List, E.T. the Extra-Terrestrial, Pearl Harbor, Twister, Nixon, Saving Private Ryan and Jumanji.

Previously Katzen held the positions of Fourth Horn with the San Diego Symphony, and Second Horn with the Grant Park Symphony in Chicago and the Phoenix Symphony. He also has played with the Chicago Symphony, Los Angeles Philharmonic and various orchestras in Europe and Israel.

In addition to his teaching and performing, he is known for what the Boston Globe referred to as the "legend of Daniel Katzen" for having auditioned 48 times before finally, in 1979, landing a spot with the Boston Symphony Orchestra. He has also performed all six of the Bach Suites for Solo Cello Cello Suites (Bach) from memory in live performances, in a version for Horn that he transcribed.  He also ran the Brass Orchestral Repertoire Class at New England Conservatory from 1996–2008.

Prof. Katzen received a B.M. "With Distinction" from Indiana University, where he was a student of Philip Farkas and Michael Höltzel and a M.M. from Northwestern University, where he studied with Dale Clevenger. He also studied under Milan Yancich and Morris Secon at the Eastman School of Music. Notable students include J. Greg Miller.

He is the brother of celebrated cookbook author and artist Mollie Katzen.

Sources 
 New England Conservatory
 CalArts
 Geoff Edgers, "6 Minutes To Shine", Boston Globe, September 4, 2005.

References

External links
 Hear Daniel Katzen in concert from WGBH Boston

American classical horn players
1952 births
Living people
Indiana University alumni
Bienen School of Music alumni
Eastman School of Music alumni
University of Arizona faculty
Musicians from Rochester, New York
Classical musicians from New York (state)